Maritoni Fernandez-Dayrit (born Antonita Maria Carmen Fernandez Moynihan; March 31, 1969) is a Filipina character actress, model and entrepreneur.

Family
She is the daughter of Antony Moynihan, 3rd Baron Moynihan, who was English with some Irish roots, and a Filipina mother. She is niece to Colin Moynihan, the current Baron Moynihan and former head of the British Olympic Association. She was reared by her grandmother in York, England during her childhood years, later moving to the Philippines to accompany her father, who became a close friend of former Philippine president Ferdinand Marcos and a successful food critic and restaurant owner in Manila in the 1980s. She is the mother of actress Lexi Fernandez, who was a former GMA Network contract artist. On September 10, 2016, her sister, Maria Aurora Moynihan, was killed in the Philippines.

Career
As an adult, she became a commercial model and actress in the Philippines, adopting the screen name Maritoni Fernandez. She has had considerable success as a screen actress, figuring in many movies with the respected Filipino actor Fernando Poe, Jr. and appearing in the award-winning Hong Kong film Days of Being Wild by acclaimed director Wong Kar-wai.

During the 90s, she worked as a showbiz columnist of Manila Standard, under the title Eksena.

In 1993, Fernandez was linked to the Brunei beauties affair.

On her 30th birthday, Fernandez was diagnosed with breast cancer and has since undergone a lumpectomy in the United States. In remission, she has been serving as a spokesperson for breast cancer patients and survivors in the Philippines and abroad.

Fernandez is currently an entrepreneur-owner of Herb-All Organic Trading Corporation, a food supplement company specializing in "young barley" powder and other natural health supplements. Simple Thoughts, her easy text floral service Bella Regalo, RSVP Event Planning and Design, and Just Desserts in addition to her jobs as commercial model and actress in television soap operas for a major Philippine television network. She resides with her children in Makati. She is a member of the ICanServe Foundation.

Filmography

Film

Television

References

External links
Herb-All Organic Trading Corporation

1969 births
Actresses from Metro Manila
Living people
21st-century Filipino businesspeople
Filipino Christians
Filipino evangelicals
Filipino female models
Filipino film actresses
Filipino people of English descent
Filipino people of Irish descent
Filipino Protestants
Filipino television actresses
Daughters of barons
People from Makati
GMA Network personalities
ABS-CBN personalities